The Daughter of the Hills is a lost 1913 silent film historical drama directed by J. Searle Dawley and starring Laura Sawyer and Wellington Playter. Daniel Frohman and Adolph Zukor produced with distribution through the State Rights system.

Cast
Laura Sawyer as Floria
Wellington Playter as Serquis
David Davies as Floria's father
Frank Van Buren as The Apostle Paul
P. W. Nares as Nero
Alexander Gaden as A Slave
Carmen De Gonzales as Leader of the Dance
Ben Breakstone as Opposing Gladiator

References

External links
 
 

1913 films
American silent feature films
Lost American films
Films directed by J. Searle Dawley
Famous Players-Lasky films
American black-and-white films
American historical drama films
1910s historical drama films
1913 lost films
Lost drama films
1913 drama films
1910s American films
Silent American drama films